Tošin Bunar is a rail station in Belgrade, Serbia. It is located in the Novi Beograd settlement in the municipality of Novi Beograd. It is served by BG Voz. The railroad continues to Zemun in one direction, and New Belgrade in the other direction. Tošin Bunar railway station consists of 2 railway tracks with 2 side platforms.

In October 2020 the station was moved some 150 meters toward Novi Beograd station, due to safety concerns.

See also 
 Serbian Railways
 BG Voz

References 

Railway stations in Belgrade
New Belgrade